Adelaide Damoah RWA FRSA (born ) is a British painter and performance artist of Ghanaian descent who uses her body as the starting point for much of her work. Themes of particular interest include feminism, colonialism, religion and spirituality.

Damoah's debut exhibition entitled "Black Brits," took place in 2006 in Charlie Allen's Boutique, Islington, London, UK and received some media attention. It was featured on BBC News, Channel 5 News and other regional and local media outlets in the UK.

Damoah's solo exhibitions to date also include Genesis, This is Us, Supermodels, Black Lipstick, and a domestic violence exhibition for the National Centre for Domestic Violence. Performances to date include This is Me the Inconsistency of the Self, My Body is Present, Homage to Ana Mendieta and #MYFACE.

Education 
Damoah studied Applied Biology at Kingston University in South West London, England graduating with honours in 1999.

Career 
Damoah worked in the pharmaceutical industry as a medical representative for six years. During that time, Damoah was diagnosed with endometriosis. As a result of the condition she left the industry. She then pursued oil painting.

Damoah's debut exhibition Black Brits was launched in 2006. The exhibition sought to examine the role of race and identity in iconography. The series, through a series of portraits, sought to question whether the race of major British icons as diverse as the Krays and David Beckham was relevant to their given status as icons. They were portrayed with reversed skin colours.

On 6 March 2006, Damoah arranged a demonstration at Parliament Square as part of Endometriosis awareness week with the Endometriosis charity Endometriosis UK. The event was marked by a communal scream by participants followed by a march to 10 Downing Street to hand in a 13,000 signature petition for the Prime Minister Tony Blair.

Damoah's second exhibition was “Supermodels" exhibited at Nolia's Gallery, London in 2008. The series of large oil paintings examined the size zero discussion, which became a popular social debate in 2006. Subsequent exhibitions include "Black Lipstick" in 2008 and "NCDV" in 2009. Damoah was invited to Hungary in 2009 to take part in an exhibition entitled "British Art in the Twenty First Century" at Opera Gallery in Budapest.

In November 2015, Damoah put on her fifth solo exhibition in Camden, London entitled "This is Us."

In October 2018, Damoah launched her sixth solo show entitled Genesis in London. Simultaneously referencing and inverting Yves Klein’s 1960 performance Anthropométrie de l’époque bleue, which saw the artist use female participants as malleable ‘printmaking tools’, Damoah has instead assumed the role of living paint brush, using her own body to make painterly gestures, exerting her power as a black female artist. The shift from male director to female protagonist has enabled Damoah to redefine how the black female body is portrayed, deconstructing stereotypes as a means of reconstructing wider socio-cultural narratives. The artist has cited David Hammons and Ana Mendieta as key influences in the production of Genesis.

The exhibition, which comprised paintings, prints and performative works, was accompanied by a dynamic events programme, including a live streamed performance by Adelaide Damoah, democratising the way in which the work is consumed, but also interrogating the complexities of internet culture and how we connect through performance. Though the work itself is complex and multi-faceted, it was built around a minimal palette of black and gold. Speaking of this decision, the artist explained that "black and gold have been used both for aesthetic and metaphorical reasons. Black is evoking skin colour, but also absence as a lived experience. Meanwhile, gold is referring to Ghana's historical source of wealth which gave it its colonial name (Gold Coast)."

Group shows in 2018 included Bonhams "We face Forward!" A celebration of contemporary Ghanaian artists including El Anatsui and Professor Ablade Glover and Muse, Model or Mistress in London.

Damoah's current work involves using her own body as "a paintbrush of sorts," by covering herself with oil paint and pressing her body onto her painting surface, leaving impressions, or traces of herself behind. Only too aware of the historic hyper-sexualisation of the black female body, Damoah is resolute that this is far from what she wishes to explore in the work. Gender and race are obvious issues which are apparent, however, Damoah maintains that the work is about much more than this. Writing on her painting surfaces using text in English, Twi and Ga, (the latter two being the languages of the artists parents) Damoah expresses a deep desire to connect with her Ghanaian roots, while entering into a conversation about where she fits in as a child of the African Diaspora. The influence of artist Artist Ana Mendieta is apparent in this new work, while direct references in her written text to artist Jean Michele Basquiat, reflect a self-confessed admiration for the artist. Damoah cites Frida Kahlo as her main artistic influence. To date, Damoah has examined social issues in her work including issues regarding race, identity, sexuality, and domestic violence.

Damoah is a founding member of the BBFA Collective and the INFEMS Collective. In September 2019, Damoah appeared in the Visual Collaborative electronic catalogue, in an issue themed Vivencias which translates to "Experiences" in Spanish. She was interviewed alongside 30 people from around the world that included Kelli Ali, Dakore Akande and Desdamona. She was a guest artist of Museum Week in Paris at the Cite nationale de l'histoire de l'immigration.

References

English painters
Living people
Modern painters
English contemporary artists
English women painters
English people of Ghanaian descent
20th-century British women artists
Black British artists
People educated at St Ursula's Convent School
21st-century British women artists
20th-century English women
20th-century English people
21st-century English women
21st-century English people
1976 births
People with Endometriosis